Dieter Ebner (born 26 June 1940) is an Austrian rower. He competed at the 1960 Summer Olympics, 1964 Summer Olympics and the 1968 Summer Olympics. He won a bronze medal at the inaugural 1962 World Rowing Championships in the coxless four event.

References

1940 births
Living people
Austrian male rowers
Olympic rowers of Austria
Rowers at the 1960 Summer Olympics
Rowers at the 1964 Summer Olympics
Rowers at the 1968 Summer Olympics
Rowers from Linz
World Rowing Championships medalists for Austria